Raging Barbora is a 1935 Czechoslovak comedy film, directed by Miroslav Cikán. It stars  Antonie Nedošinská, Theodor Pištěk, and Helena Bušová.

Cast
Antonie Nedošinská as Barbora Čápová
Theodor Pištěk as Vojtěch Čáp
Helena Bušová as Helena
Máša Rodenová as Julča
František Paul as Pavel Stehlík
Fanda Mrázek as Julius Kopřiva
Jindřich Plachta as Tailor Ludvík Mráz
Ela Šárková as Dancer Boby
Jára Kohout as Klandr
František Kreuzmann as Mr. Fredoli / Waiter
Karel Hradilák as Gigolo

References

External links

1935 films
Czechoslovak comedy films
1935 comedy films
Films directed by Miroslav Cikán
Czechoslovak black-and-white films
1930s Czech-language films
Czech comedy films
1930s Czech films